This Music is the debut studio album by Australian singer-songwriter Celia Pavey. It was released in July 2013 and peaked at number 14 on the ARIA Charts.

Background and release
In 2013 Pavey auditioned for The Voice Australia and was mentored by Delta Goodrem. In June she became the second runner-up behind Harrison Craig and Luke Kennedy. She was signed to Universal Music Australia immediately following the show and recorded an album featuring songs Pavey had performed on the show along with "a couple of extras".

"Believe Me" was released as the first official single from the album on 5 July but failed to impact the Australian singles chart.

In an interview with Cream in August 2013 Pavey responded to the question of recording original material; "It was good fun doing covers, and cover work is really good for artists to practise, but I was really excited to get one of my own compositions on there. And I can't wait to do more of that."

Critical reception
A staff writer at news.com.au gave the album 3 out of 5 stars, saying "Her 'Scarborough Fair' is enchanting and her incredible version of Joni Mitchell's 'Woodstock' would surely have got her a record deal with or without a hit TV show." They were more critical of "Xanadu", saying she had "suck[ed] all the fun out of [it]" with her cover, but concluded by saying they hoped Pavey would "see the world" and make the album she wants to make.

Track listing

Charts

Release history

References

2013 debut albums
Covers albums
Universal Music Australia albums
Vera Blue albums